Fannie Perkins Andrews Shepard (14 July 1856 – 4 June 1920) was an American physician who worked as a missionary and university lecturer in Turkey. As a result of her gender she was unable to work as a physician however she was able to work as a nurse and midwife as well as to lecture in medical botany at the Medical Department of the Central Turkey College. She also assisted widows and orphans to support themselves by providing them with the ability to sell goods they crafted. She made a scientifically significant botanical collection in and around the area she lived sending these specimens to George Edward Post thus assisting with his publication The Flora of Syria, Palestine and Sinai. Her collection is held in the Herbarium of the American University of Beirut and her type specimens are held at  Conservatory and Botanical Garden of the City of Geneva.

Early life 
Shepard was born in Maui in Hawaii on 14 July 1855 to the Andrews family, missionaries who lived in Hawaii. She was educated at Mount Holyoke College at where she graduated with a bachelor of arts in 1879. She then proceeded to the University of Michigan undertaking medical training and graduating with a medical degree in 1882. She married a fellow physician Fred D. Shepard on 15 July 1882 at Ann Arbor.

Medical work 
In 1882, Shepard moved to the Ottoman Empire with her physician husband, Fred D. Shepard and supported his work at the Azariah Smith Medical Hospital attached to Central Turkey College in Aintab. Although she was unable to work as a physician due to her gender, she was able to undertake work as a nurse and midwife at the Aintab American Hospital. Later she lectured in medical botany at the Medical Department of the Central Turkey College.

Botanising 
Shepard was the first woman to make a collection of herbarium specimens in Turkey. These specimens she sent to George Edward Post thus assisting with his publication The Flora of Syria, Palestine and Sinai. The herbarium specimens collected by Shepard now form part of the Herbarium of the American University of Beirut with the type specimens she collecting being held at the Conservatory and Botanical Garden of the City of Geneva. Post named the species Medicago shepardii in her honour.

Business 
She continued to live and work in Gaziantep between the years 1882 and 1919. While living there she established a firm called Industries for Women and Girls with Corinna Shattuck where women could work producing needlework for export. Shepard then worked with her sister Lucy C. Andrews to establish a market for the lace and needlework. Her sister, after a visit to Turkey, returned to the United States with samples of the lace and needlework, and supplied American businesses with these products. The money earned through this business helped support the women producing the products as well as fund a library building at the Central Turkey College and assisted in funding a new wing for the hospital at Aintab.

Death 
Shepard died on 4 June 1920 at Orange, New Jersey.

References 

People of the Armenian genocide
19th-century physicians from the Ottoman Empire
1856 births
1920 deaths
Witnesses of the Armenian genocide
People from Hawaii
Mount Holyoke College alumni
University of Michigan Medical School alumni
20th-century physicians from the Ottoman Empire
American botanists
American Christian missionaries